You may also be looking for Ukrainian Kholm Governorate from 1918–1919.

Kholm Governorate or Chełm Governorate (Kholmskaya Guberniya;) was an administrative unit (governorate) of the Russian Empire. Its capital was in Chełm (Russian and Ukrainian: Холм Kholm).

It was created from eastern parts of Siedlce Governorate and Lublin Governorate in 1912. It was separated from the Privislinsky Krai and joined to Kiev General Governorate as "core Russian territory", as a precaution in case Privislinsky Krai territories should be taken from the Russian Empire in an upcoming war.  Another reason for this administrative change was to facilitate Russification and conversion of the non-Eastern Orthodox Christians.

According to Russian statistical sources for 1914, while the area of the governorate was 10,460 km2, it was inhabited by approximately 912,095 inhabitants of whom about 50% were Little Russians (a demonym used for Ukrainians in Tsarist Russia), 30% Poles, and 16% Jews. However, during the retreat of the Russian Army in the summer of 1915, the Russian command gave orders to evacuate the "Russian population" of Kholm region. Due to that policy, about 2/3 of the Ukrainian population was deported to the Russian Empire in June–July 1915. The deported population was reaching some 300,000 people and thus significantly changing the national composition in the region.

Population

In 1909, the population of the lands included in the Kholm province in 1912 was 703,000 people.

The entire population of the Kholm province, according to official statistics, was about 760 thousand people: 311 thousand Catholics, 305 thousand Orthodox, 115 thousand Jews, and 28 thousand Protestants. Moreover, the Orthodox accounted for more than half of the population in Grubeshovsky, as well as some parts of the former Lubartovsk and Krasnostavsky districts. In parts of Tomashovo and Kholm districts, as well as in the former Wlodawa Uyezd, the number of Orthodox Christians exceeded the number of Catholics by about 5%. On January 1, 1914, in the Kholm province, out of a total population of 912,095 people, Ukrainians comprised 446,839, that is 50.1%, Poles - 30.5%, Jews - 15.8%.

The national composition of the territories of the districts, which were included in the Kholm province in 1912 according to the data of 1897:

Administrative Divisions 
The Kholm governorate consisted of 8 Uyezds (see table below, note Russian spellings for administrative centres used).

References

External links
  The legal document of the Russian Duma that proclaims the creation of the Kholm Governorate. 
 Map of Kholm region

Governorates of the Russian Empire
States and territories established in 1912
 
Chełm
1912 establishments in the Russian Empire
History of Lublin Voivodeship
History of Masovian Voivodeship